Wuping (Hakka: Vú-phìn) is a county in of southwestern Fujian province, People's Republic of China, bordering Guangdong to the south and Jiangxi to the west. It is under the administration of Longyan City.

Administration
The county executive, legislature and judiciary are in the town of Pingchuan (平川), together with the CPC and PSB branches.

Towns (镇, zhen)
Taoxi
Zhongbao
Shifang
Zhongshan
Yanqian (岩前)

Townships (乡, xiang)
Xiangdian
Dahe
Yongping()
Dongliu
Wan'an
Wudong
Chengxiang
Minzhu
Xiaba (下坝)
Zhongchi
Xiangdong

Climate

References

 
County-level divisions of Fujian
Longyan